Shipman is a hamlet in the Canadian province of Saskatchewan.

The Shipman post office opened in 1933.  Its school district was organized in 1934, a school was built which opened in 1934.  The original industry was a saw mill that cut timber into cordwood which was loaded into boxcars at the community.  As the land was cleared farming became the main industry.  A grain elevator was built in 1935.

Shipman had a number of serious fires, burning businesses including "three grocery stores, a restaurant, service station, poolroom, the community hall, grain elevator and annex."

In 1975 the school was closed, the elevator in 1981, and the rail line was abandoned in the early 90s.

Demographics 

References 

Designated places in Saskatchewan
Hamlets in Saskatchewan
Torch River No. 488, Saskatchewan